Church of the Nazarene may refer to:

 Church of the Nazarene, an international Christian denomination with a Wesleyan-holiness theology.
 Georgia District Church of the Nazarene, the Georgia District of the Southeast USA Region of the Church of the Nazarene.
 Church of the Nazarene (Casa Grande, Arizona), listed on the NRHP in Pinal County, Arizona
 Church of the Nazarene (Essex, New York), listed on the NRHP in New York